Wiha Tools is a manufacturer of hand tools for use in trade and industry, with its headquarters in Schonach im Schwarzwald in Baden-Württemberg, Germany.

History 
The company was founded in Wuppertal in 1939 by Willi Hahn. His initials form the company name. Four years later the company headquarters were relocated to Schonach. While initially only nuts and bolts were manufactured, eight years later in 1947 the production of screwdrivers commenced. The other core product groups were gradually built in the following years.
In 1966 the plant in Mönchweiler/Black Forest was acquired - now housing the blades and L-keys production. In 1985 a subsidiary was founded in the USA (today's Willi Hahn Corp.) Over the years further branches were established in France, Spain, England, Denmark, Poland, China and Vietnam. Next to follow were Wiha Thailand, Canada, and Asia Pacific.

The company lists 3500 different hand tools in its stock catalogue, including screwdrivers, torque wrenches and L-keys, bits, pliers, hammers and measuring tools. The owner managed company employs 750 staff worldwide.

Since 2010 the company is title sponsor of the regional basketball team Wiha Panthers Schwenningen.

Awards 
Wiha has repeatedly received awards for product design, innovation and social commitment - amongst these, almost 20 "iF awards" including gold for the Wiha magazine bit holder and about 10 "Red Dot Awards" including the "Red Dot Best of the Best".

References

External links 
 

Tool manufacturing companies of Germany
Companies based in Baden-Württemberg
German companies established in 1939
German brands
Manufacturing companies established in 1939